Silesian Parliament or Silesian Sejm was the governing body of the Silesian Voivodeship (1920–1939), an autonomous voivodeship of the Second Polish Republic between 1920 and 1945. It was elected in democratic elections and had certain influence over the usage of taxes collected in Silesia. It consisted of 48 deputies (24 from 1935).

History
The eastern part of Upper Silesia became part of the Second Polish Republic following the Silesian Uprisings throughout the Upper Silesian region between 1918 and 1921, and Upper Silesia Plebiscite. The land was subsequently divided by an allied commission and the League of Nations, leaving Katowice region on the Polish side. Together with Cieszyn Silesia it formed Silesian Voievodeship with significant autonomy (Silesian Parliament as a constituency and Silesian Voivodship Council as the executive body).

Building
Designed by architect , the Silesian Parliament was built in 1925–1929 in the Stripped Classicist style. For a very long time it was the biggest structure in Poland. Currently it hosts the offices of the Silesian Voivodship. The building has seven floors and contains one of four paternoster lifts currently in use in Poland. The Polish architect Adolf Szysko-Bohusz announced a competition for the design of the new Silesian Parliament in 1925, who wished the building to espouse the local Polish cultural identity of the region, instead of the more customary German/ Prussian style. When the building was inaugurated in May 1929, Michal Grazynski, President of the Province of Upper silesia, called the building a "material symbol of Polish culture and power".

The building is one of Poland's official national Historic Monuments (Pomnik historii), as designated October 22, 2012 and tracked by the National Heritage Board of Poland.

Composition

1922

1930 (I)

1930 (II)

1935

Leadership 

Leadership (1922-29):

 Marshal of the Sejm: Konstanty Wolny;
 Deputy Marshal of the Sejm: Józef Biniszkiewicz, Michał Grajek, Eduard Pant, Kazimierz Rakowski, Edward Rybarz.

Leadership (1930):

 Marshal of the Sejm: Konstanty Wolny;
 Deputy Marshal of the Sejm: Emil Caspari, Włodzimierz Dąbrowski, Eduard Pant.

Leadership (1930-35):

 Marshal of the Sejm: Konstanty Wolny;
 Deputy Marshal of the Sejm: Włodzimierz Dąbrowski, Eduard Pant, Emil Gajdas, Jan Kędzior.

Leadership (1935-39):

 Marshal of the Sejm: ;
 Deputy Marshal of the Sejm: Włodzimierz Dąbrowski, Alojzy Kot.

References

Literature
 Nowak Jerzy (kier.): Przewodnik po Katowicach, Wydawnictwo „Śląsk”, Katowice 1962, s. 228;
 Rechowicz Henryk: Sejm Śląski 1922−1939, Wydawnictwo „Śląsk”, Katowice 1971;
 Sala Sejmu Śląskiego to dla nas ważne miejsce (pol.) www.katowice.naszemiasto.pl [dostęp 2011-05-19];
 Wojciech Janota: Katowice między wojnami. Miasto i jego sprawy 1922–1939. Łódź: Księży Młyn, 2010, s. 11, 12. .

Silesian Voivodeship (1920–1939)
Sejm